Public Works Department (abbrev: PWD, JKR) is a department under the Ministry of Development responsible for the development and maintenance of infrastructures in Brunei.

Services 
Water
Roads
Drainage
Sewerage
Asset Management 
Health, Safety & Environment (HSE) 
Mechanical & Electrical 
Project Management
Green Building Initiatives
Landslide Protection
Coastal Protection

Departments
There are 8 Departments under JKR, which are under the Director General (DG), also known as Ketua Pengarah; and Deputy Director General (DDG), also known as Timbalan Ketua Pengarah:
 Department of Administration and Finance (DAF) (Jabatan Pentadbiran dan Kewangan)
Department of Building Services (DBS) (Jabatan Perkhidmatan Bangunan)
Department of Development (DOD) (Jabatan Kemajuan)
Department of Drainage and Sewerage (DDS) (Jabatan Saliran dan Pembetungan)
Department of Road (DOR) (Jabatan Jalan Raya)
Department of Technical Services (DTS) (Jabatan Khidmat Teknikal)
Department of Water Services (DWS) (Jabatan Perkhidmatan Air)
 Department of Mechanical & Electrical Services (DME) (Jabatan Mekanikal & Elektrikal)

External links
Public Works Department official website

Government of Brunei
Brunei